Brahmondi Kamini Kishore Moulik Government High School is an old and reputed school situated at West Brahmondi, Narsingdi Sadar of Narsingdi district of Bangladesh.

History 
The school was established in 1946 by landlord and Homeopathy doctor Jitendra Kishore Moulik to honour his father Kamini Kishore Moulik. It was later associated with Narsingdi Government College for a few years from 1955, hence the name of the school was Brahmondi K.K.M. Collegiate School for that period. Afterwards, the school was nationalized as the first school of Narsingdi in 1 April, 1981. It was a mixed school until 1991. After that, it was transformed into a boys institution.

Teachers and Staffs 
At present there are 72 teachers working here.

Extra-Curricular Activities 
Besides education the school offers co-curricular activities such as scouting and debating.

References

Schools in Bangladesh